Qarah Batlaq (also Romanized as Qarah Bāţlāq and Qareh Bāţlāq) is a village in Mah Neshan Rural District, in the Central District of Mahneshan County, Zanjan Province, Iran. At the 2006 census, its population was 629, in 138 families.

References 

Populated places in Mahneshan County